Sen Svaja (from Old Prussian: sen swajjais – 'with our own', 'with those who we know') is a Lithuanian experimental post-folk and world music band from Vilnius, formed in 2010. The band consists of Dorotė Girskienė, Živilė Razinkovienė and Agota Zdanavičiūtė. Sen Svaja focuses on ancient Lithuanian folk songs and folk music worldwide, also integrating elements of oriental music, Slavic folk and jazz music in their sound.

History 

In 2015 the band released their debut album Laumių lopšinė (Lullaby of Hags) dedicated to the late former high priest of Romuva Jonas Trinkūnas.

Sen Svaja's song "Aš atsikėliau" was included in the Lithuanian Music Information Centre's compilation "Note Lithuania: Folk/World 2018". In 2018 the band released their 2nd studio album Kraitis iš pelkės, whose presentation concert took place on May 18 at the Vingis Park.

Members
 Dorotė Girskienė – vocals and percussion 
 Živilė Razinkovienė – vocals, kanklės, and percussion
 Agota Zdanavičiūtė – vocals, kanklės, and percussion

Discography 
Laumių Lopšinė (2015)
Kraitis Iš Pelkės (2018)

References

External links 
YouTube channel
Facebook page
BandCamp page

2010 establishments in Lithuania
Neofolk music groups
World music groups
Musical groups established in 2010
Lithuanian musical groups